Cetema elongatum is a species of fly in the family Chloropidae, the grass flies. It is found in the Palearctic. The larva feeds on Poaceae.

References

External links
 Ecology of Commanster

Chloropinae
Insects described in 1830